"Black and Blue" is a song by American rock band Van Halen from their 1988 album OU812. It was the first single released from the album, peaking at number 34 on the Billboard Hot 100 and at number 1 on the Billboard Album Rock Tracks chart,

Cash Box called it a "power-rocker that nearly sizzles off the vinyl" and praised Sammy Hagar's singing and Eddie Van Halen's guitar playing.

Personnel 

 Michael Anthony – bass guitar, vocals
 Sammy Hagar – lead vocals
 Alex Van Halen – drums
 Eddie Van Halen – guitar

References

Further reading

1988 songs
1988 singles
Van Halen songs
Songs written by Eddie Van Halen
Songs written by Alex Van Halen
Songs written by Michael Anthony (musician)
Songs written by Sammy Hagar
Warner Records singles